Hiram Bingham may refer to:

 Hiram Bingham I (1789–1869), American missionary to the Kingdom of Hawai'i
 Hiram Bingham II (1831–1908), son of Hiram Bingham I, also a missionary to the Kingdom of Hawai'i
 Hiram Bingham III (1875–1956), U.S. Senator from Connecticut and explorer best known for uncovering Machu Picchu
 Hiram Bingham IV (1903–1988), U.S. Vice Consul in Marseille, France during World War II who rescued Jews from the Holocaust
 Harry Payne Bingham (1887–1955), American financier and philanthropist

See also
 Hiram (disambiguation)
 Bingham (surname)
 Bingham (disambiguation)